Ysgol Gyfun Gymunedol Penweddig (Penweddig Community Comprehensive School in English) is a Welsh-language, community comprehensive school situated in Llanbadarn Fawr, Aberystwyth, Wales. The school was established in 1973. The school was the first Welsh language secondary school in Ceredigion and is named after the cantref of Penweddig, the northern part of the Kingdom of Ceredigion, between the rivers Dyfi and Ystwyth.

The school had 608 pupils on roll in 2020. During the last Estyn school inspection, it was reported that Welsh is spoken at home by 69% of pupils, with all pupils being able to speak Welsh fluently.

The school's building is owned by a private company who lease it to the school.

When the school was started in the mid-70s the school was housed in Ffordd Dewi, Aberystwyth. In October 2001, following a lengthy consultation with parents, staff and pupils, the school moved to its current home in Llanbadarn Road.

The current Headteacher is Dr. Rhodri Thomas who joined the school in 2020 from Ysgol Gyfun Glantaf in Cardiff. Dr. Thomas replaced Mr. Gwenallt Llwyd Ifan who retired in 2018.

School council
The school council is formed before the autumn half term holidays, and meets regularly to discuss improvements to the school, be it physically or structurally. It comprises two representatives from every school year (one male; one female) elected by the whole of the respective year, and two permanent members representing the local youth service (also pupils). The council is mentored by the deputy headteacher.

Notable alumni
Notable former pupils include:
Ifan Daniel, Head of Mergers and Acquisitions at Man Group plc
Owen Evans, Chief Executive of S4C
Rhys Evans, BBC Wales
Aled Haydn Jones, Head of BBC Radio 1
Jacob Ifan, actor
Gwyneth Keyworth, actress
Georgia Ruth, singer-songwriter

References

Penweddig
Secondary schools in Ceredigion
1973 establishments in Wales
Buildings and structures in Aberystwyth
Educational institutions established in 1973